Thomas L. Durrance was a college football player. He was a prominent halfback for the Florida Gators of the University of Florida from  1969 to 1971; one of the "Super Sophs". During his sophomore season, he scored 110 points—then the school record, and still tied for second on the Gators' single-season records list. He was only the second person in SEC history to score 100. His 18 touchdowns gave him the nickname of "Touchdown Tommy."  Durrance finished his three-year college career with 2,582 yards of combined rushing and receiving yardage. He was from Daytona Beach.

See also
 List of University of Florida Athletic Hall of Fame members

References

American football halfbacks
Florida Gators football players
Sportspeople from Daytona Beach, Florida
1950 births
2005 deaths